Kiyou Shimizu (清水希容, Shimizu Kiyō, born 7 December 1993) is a Japanese karateka competing in the women's kata event. She won the silver medal in the women's kata event at the 2020 Summer Olympics in Tokyo, Japan. She is also a two-time gold medalist at the World Karate Championships and a two-time gold medalist at the Asian Games.

Career 

In 2014, she represented Japan at the Asian Games in Incheon, South Korea, and she won the gold medal in the women's kata event. A month later, she became world champion in this event at the 2014 World Karate Championships held in Bremen, Germany. In 2015, she won the gold medal in this event at the Asian Karate Championships held in Yokohama, Japan.

At the 2016 World Karate Championships in Linz, Austria, she repeated her 2014 success by winning the gold medal in the women's kata event for the second time. In 2017, she won the gold medal in the women's kata event at the World Games held in Wrocław, Poland. In the final, she defeated Sandra Sánchez of Spain.

In 2018, she won a medal in three major tournaments. At the 2018 Asian Karate Championships held in Amman, Jordan, she won the gold medal in the women's kata event. She also won the gold medal in the women's kata event at the Asian Games held in Jakarta, Indonesia. Her success continued at the World Karate Championships held in Madrid, Spain where she won the silver medal in the women's individual kata event. In the final, she lost against Sandra Sánchez of Spain.

At the 2019 Asian Karate Championships held in Tashkent, Uzbekistan, she won the gold medal in the women's individual kata event.

She represented Japan at the 2020 Summer Olympics in karate. She reached the final in the women's kata event, but lost the gold medal bout to Spain's Sandra Sánchez Jamie.

Personal life 

She studied at Kansai University.

Achievements

References

External links 

 
 

1993 births
Living people
Sportspeople from Osaka
Japanese female karateka
Kansai University alumni
Karateka at the 2014 Asian Games
Karateka at the 2018 Asian Games
Asian Games medalists in karate
Asian Games gold medalists for Japan
Medalists at the 2014 Asian Games
Medalists at the 2018 Asian Games
Competitors at the 2017 World Games
World Games medalists in karate
World Games gold medalists
Olympic karateka of Japan
Karateka at the 2020 Summer Olympics
Medalists at the 2020 Summer Olympics
Olympic medalists in karate
Olympic silver medalists for Japan
21st-century Japanese women